Cătălin Munteanu (born 26 January 1979) is a Romanian former professional footballer who played as a central midfielder.

Club career
Cătălin Munteanu, nicknamed "Cap de Zmeu" (Head of Zmeu) was born on 26 January 1979 in Bucharest. Munteanu started to play senior football at Steaua București, making his Liga I debut on 16 March 1997 in a 3–1 victory against Rapid București. In his first season spent at the club, he helped the club win The Double, making 12 Liga I appearances and scoring 5 goals. In the following season he helped Steaua win another title, being the team's top-goalscorer with 17 goals scored in 33 matches, also he started to play in European competitions, scoring one goal in his debut in the first leg of the 5–3 victory on aggregate against CSKA Sofia in the 1997–98 Champions League first qualifying round and two goals that helped the team pass Bastia with the away goal rule in the 3–3 on aggregate in the second round of the 1997–98 UEFA Cup.

Salamanca paid €3.6 million for Munteanu's transfer from Steaua in 1998, where he played in the first two leagues until 2001, being colleague with fellow Romanians Bogdan Stelea and Lucian Marinescu, also during that period the club was nicknamed "Salamanca Rumana", because Ovidiu Stîngă and Gabriel Popescu also played for the club around that period. He was bought by Atlético Madrid, but did not play a single game there, being loaned for one season at Espanyol Barcelona in La Liga and then at Albacete where he played for two seasons, in the first one he helped the club promote from the second division to the first. Afterwards he went to play for Real Murcia in the Segunda División where he suffered a knee injury that kept him off the field for six months.

Munteanu went back to Romania in the middle of the 2005–06 season, signing with Dinamo București, where in the following season he scored 4 goals in 32 appearances, including opening the score with a spectacular goal from 27 meters in a 4–2 victory in a derby against Steaua, helping the team win the title, also appearing in 12 matches in which he scored 3 goals, including one goal in the 3–1 loss on aggregate against Benfica as the club reached the sixteenths-finals of the 2006–07 UEFA Cup. In 2008, Munteanu left Dinamo to go play for two seasons at FC Brașov, after which he came back to play for The Red Dogs for a second spell of four seasons in which he won a Cupa României and a Supercupa României, after which he ended his career by playing another half of year at FC Brașov and a half a year at Viitorul Constanța where on 15 March 2015 he made his last Liga I appearance in a 2–1 away victory against CFR Cluj. Cătălin Munteanu has a total of 56 matches and four goals scored in La Liga, 107 matches and 19 goals scored in Segunda División, 280 games and 37 goals scored in Divizia A and 36 games played with 8 goals scored in European competitions.

International career
Cătălin Munteanu played 17 matches and scored one goal for Romania, making his debut on 19 November 1997, when coach Anghel Iordănescu sent him on the field in order to replace Viorel Moldovan at half-time in a friendly which ended 1–1 against Spain played on Lluís Sitjar Stadium from Palma de Mallorca. He played four games and scored one goal at the successful Euro 2000 qualifiers, but was not a part of the squad that played at the final tournament. He played 5 games at the 2002 World Cup qualifiers, including his last appearance for the national team which took place on 2 June 2001 in a 2–0 victory against Hungary.

Career statistics

Club

International stats

International
Scores and results list Romania's goal tally first, score column indicates score after each Munteanu goal.

Honours
Steaua București
Divizia A: 1996–97, 1997–98 
Cupa României: 1996–97
Dinamo București
Liga I: 2006–07
Cupa României: 2011–12
Supercupa României: 2012

References

External links

1979 births
Living people
Footballers from Bucharest
Romanian footballers
Association football midfielders
Romania international footballers
Romania under-21 international footballers
FC Steaua București players
UD Salamanca players
Atlético Madrid footballers
RCD Espanyol footballers
Albacete Balompié players
Real Murcia players
FC Dinamo București players
FC Brașov (1936) players
FC Viitorul Constanța players
Liga I players
La Liga players
Segunda División players
Romanian expatriate footballers
Expatriate footballers in Spain
Romanian expatriate sportspeople in Spain
Romanian football managers
FC Petrolul Ploiești managers